The 76th British Academy Film Awards, more commonly known as the BAFTAs, were held on 19 February 2023, honouring the best national and foreign films of 2022, at the Royal Festival Hall within London's Southbank Centre. Presented by the British Academy of Film and Television Arts, accolades were handed out for the best feature-length film and documentaries of any nationality that were screened at British cinemas in 2022.

The nominations were announced on 19 January 2023 via a global livestream, hosted by actors Hayley Atwell and Toheeb Jimoh, from the arts charity's newly redeveloped HQ at 195 Piccadilly, London. The EE Rising Star Award nominees, which is the only category voted for by the British public, were announced on 17 January 2023.

The German-language epic anti-war drama All Quiet on the Western Front received the most nominations with fourteen, tying the record set by Crouching Tiger, Hidden Dragon (2000) as the most nominated non-English language film in the awards' history; winning seven of these, including Best Film, Best Director (Edward Berger) and Best Film Not in the English Language, the World War I epic set a new record for the most BAFTA wins for a non-English language film.

The ceremony was co-hosted by Swazi-English BAFTA- and Academy Award-nominated actor Richard E. Grant and British television personality Alison Hammond, who also helmed the backstage interviews. Presenters Vick Hope and BBC Radio 1 film critic Ali Plumb hosted the red carpet pre-show. The broadcast aired on BBC One and BBC iPlayer in the UK, and was simulcast globally in eight countries.

Winners and nominees

The BAFTA longlists were unveiled on 6 January 2023, featuring between ten and sixteen nominees in each category. The nominees were announced on 19 January 2023. The winners were announced on 19 February 2023.

BAFTA Fellowship

 Sandy Powell

Awards
Winners are listed first and highlighted in boldface.

Ceremony information

The format of the 2023 awards ceremony was altered somewhat by the British Academy of Film and Television Arts, with the inclusion of a live broadcast of the awards for the final four categories, rather than the pre-recorded format used in previous years. There was also a backstage studio for interviews with winners, nominees and others, and various music performances during the broadcast. The broadcast was streamed live by BritBox in eight other countries: Australia, Canada, Denmark, Finland, Norway, South Africa, Sweden and the United States.

Across all categories, German war film All Quiet on the Western Front achieved the most nominations, with fourteen; it was not the only foreign-language film to receive major nominations, with this suggested to be reflective of a similar change in consumption of non-English media. All Quiet on the Western Front tied with 2000's Crouching Tiger, Hidden Dragon in being the most nominated non-English film in BAFTA history; both films also tie with 2007's Atonement as the second-most nominated films ever, behind 1982's Gandhi, which received sixteen nominations. Additionally, mixed-language films The Banshees of Inisherin and Everything Everywhere All at Once each received ten nominations, this year's second-most total. Media noted that the nominations largely omitted some films that were seeing success at other award shows, including Avatar: The Way of Water, The Fabelmans and Top Gun: Maverick, with other popular films being completely shut out.

By intention, the nominated films in 2023 were diverse in both scale and talent: multiple nominations were given to both Hollywood blockbusters and regional indie films, while there was also "40% ethnic diversity in [the] nominees." There had been 120 changes made to the voting process for the 2023 Awards, notably expanding the longlist and making jurors watch a certain percentage of the films on it, as well as randomly assigning required viewing to counter bias in the selection of films voters watch, and adding 1,000 new BAFTA members from underrepresented backgrounds. BAFTA CEO Jane Millichip indicated that there may be future changes to the voting process, saying that it will be reviewed and reassessed each year.

In the week before the ceremony took place, Bulgarian journalist Christo Grozev, who had played a key role in the nominated documentary Navalny, which won Best Documentary, said he had been banned from attending due to being a "security risk"; the film's producers instead paid tribute to him when they collected the award.

Ahead of the ceremony, it was announced that it was expected to be one of the most attended in the Academy's history. The ceremony was held at the Royal Festival Hall within London's Southbank Centre, the host venue of the British Academy Television Awards and British Academy Games Awards; in changing venue, it was the first time since the 69th British Academy Film Awards (2016) that the ceremony was not held at the Royal Albert Hall. Swazi-English actor Richard E. Grant hosted for the first time, being joined by television personality Alison Hammond for some segments.

After a two-year in-person absence, BAFTA president William, Prince of Wales and his wife, Catherine, Princess of Wales, attended the ceremony. Following the death of the Queen, Millichip was asked if the royal family were still an appropriate fit for the awards body; in answering, she mentioned Elizabeth II's decision to gift the royalties from a documentary on the family to BAFTA forerunner, the Society of Film and Television Arts, in the early 1970s, aiding its move to its current headquarters, and concluded: "I think the royal family has had an incredibly positive effect on BAFTA over the years and continues to."

There were several special performances during the ceremony. Ariana DeBose opened the ceremony with a contemporary musical performance celebrating nominated women; she would later return to present the award for Best Actor in a Supporting Role following her Best Actress in a Supporting Role win the previous year. Mercury Prize-winning artist Little Simz later performed "Heart on Fire", a track from her album "No Thank You", accompanied by Joan Armatrading. The performance was praised by fans on social media. A special tribute to the late Queen was led by Dame Helen Mirren; as well as her status, the Queen had a close association with BAFTA, while Mirren won the Academy Award and BAFTA for her portrayal of the Queen in the 2006 biopic The Queen.

During the award presentation of Best Actress in a Supporting Role, Carey Mulligan was initially announced as the winner instead of actual winner Kerry Condon, after a mistake in the interpretation of presenter Troy Kotsur's sign language; this was heavily edited out of the television broadcast.

The broadcast concluded with live coverage of four categories (in the following order): EE Rising Star Award, Best Actor in a Leading Role, Best Actress in a Leading Role, and Best Film. The ceremony ran from 7:00 p.m to 9:00 p.m., with a switch from pre-recorded to live broadcast at around 8:30 p.m. All Quiet on the Western Front won Best Film, as well as taking the most awards, with seven; "We've been blessed with so many nominations and winning this is just incredible," said producer Malte Grunert while accepting the award on stage. The Banshees of Inisherin and Elvis followed with four awards each. However, Everything Everywhere All at Once, a favorite heading into the 95th Academy Awards, was largely snubbed; it won only one award: Best Editing. With its seven wins, All Quiet on the Western Front achieved a new record for the most BAFTAs for a film not in the English language; the record was previously held by Cinema Paradiso, which won five BAFTAs in 1991.

Criticism
Despite the diversity in nominations, the winners were all white, something criticised on social media and by activist journalists, with grievances particularly directed at a photograph of all the winners on stage together, with black co-host Alison Hammond the only non-white person in it. Some Twitter users began utilising the hashtag "BaftasSoWhite", akin to the "OscarsSoWhite" hashtag, which trended when there were no non-white performers nominated at the 87th and 88th Academy Awards in 2015 and 2016, respectively.

Statistics

In Memoriam
The In Memoriam montage this year was played to an acoustic cover of the song "Remember", performed by Becky Hill and David Guetta.

The following appeared:

 Vangelis Papathanassiou
 Hugh Hudson
 Angela Lansbury
 Biyi Bandele
 Raquel Welch
 Irene Cara
 James Caan
 Louise Fletcher
 Jean-Luc Godard
 Burt Bacharach
 Monty Norman
 David Warner
 Leslie Phillips
 Gina Lollobrigida
 Paul Sorvino
 Ray Liotta
 Mike Hodges
 Jimmy Flynn
 Irene Papas
 Mylène Demongeot
 Charlbi Dean
 Anne Heche
 William Hurt
 Sylvia Syms
 Mamoun Hassan
 Simone Bär
 Deborah Saban
 Jaspreet Bal Squires
 Christopher Tucker
 Tim Devine
 Sydney Samuelson
 Olivia Newton-John
 Robbie Coltrane

See also

 12th AACTA International Awards
 95th Academy Awards
 50th Annie Awards
 11th Canadian Screen Awards
 48th César Awards
 28th Critics' Choice Awards
 75th Directors Guild of America Awards
 36th European Film Awards
 80th Golden Globe Awards
 43rd Golden Raspberry Awards
 37th Goya Awards
 38th Independent Spirit Awards
 28th Lumières Awards
 12th Magritte Awards
 10th Platino Awards
 34th Producers Guild of America Awards
 27th Satellite Awards
 48th Saturn Awards
 29th Screen Actors Guild Awards
 75th Writers Guild of America Awards

References

External links
 

2023 in London
2022 film awards
2023 in British cinema
Events at the Royal Albert Hall
2022 awards in the United Kingdom
2023 awards in the United Kingdom
Film076
February 2023 events in the United Kingdom